Authukurichi is a village in the Udayarpalayam taluk of Ariyalur district, Tamil Nadu, India.

Demographics 

As per the 2001 census, Authukurichi had a total population of 5540 with 2766 males and 2774 females.

References 

Villages in Ariyalur district